Louis Bergdoll House is a historic home located in the Brewerytown neighborhood of Philadelphia, Pennsylvania.  It was built in 1885 and is in a Germanic Gothic-style.

It was added to the National Register of Historic Places in 1985.

References

Houses on the National Register of Historic Places in Philadelphia
Gothic Revival architecture in Pennsylvania
Houses completed in 1885
Lower North Philadelphia